Charles D. Robinson (October 22, 1822 – September 25, 1886) was an American businessman and Democratic politician.  He served as the 3rd Secretary of State of Wisconsin, and was the Mayor of Green Bay, Wisconsin, in 1866 and 1872.

Early life and education

Charles D. Robinson was born in Marcellus, New York.  His father died when he was young, and he and his two siblings were raised by their mother.  He was only formally educated until age twelve.

Early career

He arrived in Green Bay, then part of the Wisconsin Territory, on July 4, 1846.  On August 13 of that year, he published the first edition of The Green Bay Advocate—he continued publishing this paper until his death.

In November 1849, Robinson was elected to his first public office as representative of Brown County to the Wisconsin State Assembly for the 3rd Wisconsin Legislature.  Two years later, in November 1851, he was elected as the Democratic Party candidate for Wisconsin Secretary of State.  He served for two years under Whig Party Governor Leonard J. Farwell.

After leaving public office, he entered a partnership in the lumber business with future United States Senator Timothy O. Howe and Charles E. Tyler.  His brother-in-law, David Ballou, bought out the business in 1855, after a fire.  The business prospered until 1859, when it succumbed to the ongoing effects of the Panic of 1857.

Civil War service

In the summer of 1861, after the outbreak of the American Civil War, Robinson enlisted for service with the Union Army.  He was appointed to the staff of General Rufus King with the rank of Captain and assistant Quartermaster.  In this capacity, he supervised the raising of bridges to assist the movement of the army in Virginia.  He became extremely ill while camped at Fredericksburg, Virginia, and was sent to New York to recuperate.  He ultimately resigned his commission on April 21, 1864, and returned to Green Bay.  It was said his illness had so changed his appearance that his mother did not recognize him.

Correspondence with President Lincoln

In 1864, after his resignation from the Army, Robinson sent a letter to President Abraham Lincoln, delivered via Governor of Wisconsin Alexander Randall.  Lincoln read his letter and responded with a four-page response dated August 17, 1864.  In his response, Lincoln defends his decision on emancipation as necessary for the Union cause.  From Lincoln's response, it can be inferred that Robinson had written in opposition to abolition.

Postbellum years

Robinson returned to public office when he was elected Mayor of Green Bay, Wisconsin, in 1866.  And, in 1869, he was nominated by the Democratic Party as their candidate for Governor of Wisconsin.  He was defeated in the November general election by incumbent Republican Governor Lucius Fairchild, who earned his third term.

During his one-year term as Mayor in 1866, he proposed the construction of the Green Bay & Lake Pepin Railway.  In 1870, when the railroad was incorporated, Robinson was chosen as the first President of the company.

He was re-elected Mayor of Green Bay in 1872.  During this term, he advocated for the construction of the Sturgeon Bay Canal and supported the extension of the Milwaukee & Northern Railroad to Green Bay.

In the summer of 1876, he was again struck by near-fatal illness and left Wisconsin to recuperate in New York.

Personal life and family

Charles D. Robinson married his first wife, Sarah A. Wilcox, on December 30, 1846, in Green Bay.  They had two children together before her death in 1852.  On July 12, 1854, Robinson remarried, this time to Abigail "Abbie" Colburn Ballou.  Abbie was active in the management of Robinson's paper, the Advocate, and took over as publisher of the paper when his health began to fail in 1881.  She continued running the paper for two years after his death.

Robinson died in Green Bay, September 25, 1886.

References

Secretaries of State of Wisconsin
Democratic Party members of the Wisconsin State Assembly
Mayors of Green Bay, Wisconsin
People of Wisconsin in the American Civil War
1822 births
1886 deaths
19th-century American politicians